Surviving Africa is an Italian reality show broadcast on Italia 1 and presented by Simona Ventura.

Format

Seasons

Season 1
The first season is expected to be launched in November 2017.

Contestants

Nominations table

TV Ratings

References

External links

2010s Italian television series